"Start a Fire" is a song by American rapper Lil Wayne featuring American singer Christina Milian. It was released on November 24, 2014 by Young Money Entertainment, Cash Money Records and Republic Records.

Release and promotion
The song was released on November 24, 2014 on iTunes. The song was also released on Spotify, make it available to stream online. One day before the release date, Lil Wayne premiered the single at 42nd American Music Awards ceremony with Christina Milian.

Live performance
As Lil Wayne promoted the single, he performed the song at 42nd American Music Awards with Christina Milian. On YouTube, there is a video of the performing of Lil Wayne and Christina Milian at 42nd AMA and available worldwide.

Charts

References

2014 singles
2014 songs
Lil Wayne songs
Cash Money Records singles
Songs written by Lil Wayne
Songs written by Christina Milian